Silas Sitai  (died 31 October 1972) was a Solomon Islands civil servant. He served as Shadow Chairman of the Governing Council between 1971 and 1972, the first Solomon Islander to hold the post.

Biography
Originally from Santa Ana, Sitai attended All Hallows' School and Queen Victoria School in Fiji. He joined the civil service as a clerk in 1939, initially working in the Resident Commissioner's office in Tulagi. Having learnt morse code, he attended a training course in Suva to become a wireless operator. When World War II started he joined the Fiji Naval Reserve, before returning to serve in the BSIP Defence Force alongside the United States Marine Corps.

Following the war, Sitai returned to Suva to finish studying. He then came back to the Solomon Islands and rejoined the civil service, becoming a clerk in Eastern District. By 1954 he had become Assistant Administrative Assistant, and was awarded the British Empire Medal in the 1954 Birthday Honours. He transferred to Central District in 1958, before becoming the Public Service Officer on the Land Trust Board in 1962. Two years later he was appointed District Officer in Central District, before transferring to the same post for Isabel Island the following year. He also served as a magistrate, and was made an MBE in the 1970 Birthday Honours. In 1971 he was appointed Shadow Chairman of the Governing Council, becoming the first Speaker of the legislature.

Sitai retired from the civil service in July 1972. A heavy smoker, he died of a heart attack in October the same year.

References

People educated at Queen Victoria School (Fiji)
Solomon Islands military personnel of World War II
Solomon Islands civil servants
Recipients of the British Empire Medal
Members of the Order of the British Empire
Members of the Governing Council of the Solomon Islands
Speakers of the National Parliament of the Solomon Islands
1972 deaths